Herman Goldstein (December 8, 1931 – January 24, 2020) was an American criminologist and legal scholar known for developing the problem-oriented policing model. He was Professor at the University of Wisconsin Law School, where he began teaching in 1964. He previously worked as an assistant to the then-superintendent of the Chicago Police Department, O.W. Wilson. In 2018, he was awarded the Stockholm Prize in Criminology in honor of his research on policing.

Goldstein died in January 2020 at the age of 88. His funeral took place at Beth Israel Center in Madison, WI.

References

External links
Faculty profile

1931 births
2020 deaths
Writers from New London, Connecticut
20th-century American lawyers
American criminologists
American legal scholars
American people of Lithuanian-Jewish descent
Jewish American academics
University of Wisconsin Law School faculty
Winners of the Stockholm Prize in Criminology
University of Pennsylvania alumni
Wisconsin lawyers
21st-century American Jews